Francis Herbert "Dobie" Stadsvold (September 22, 1891 – December 7, 1965) was an American college basketball player and coach. As a forward for the Minnesota Golden Gophers between 1913–14 and 1916–17, he was named a consensus All-American in 1916–17. Just several years later, Stadsvold was named the head coach for West Virginia University's men's basketball team. He led the Mountaineers from 1919 to 1920 through 1932–33 and compiled an overall record of 149–133.

Head coaching record

References

1891 births
1965 deaths
All-American college men's basketball players
Basketball players from Minnesota
Forwards (basketball)
Minnesota Golden Gophers men's basketball players
People from Polk County, Minnesota
West Virginia Mountaineers football coaches
West Virginia Mountaineers men's basketball coaches
American men's basketball players
Basketball coaches from Minnesota